Arthur Leonard Johnson (July 1, 1921 – September 12, 2003) was a Canadian sprint canoeist who competed in the early 1950s. He finished eighth in the C-2 1000 m event at the 1952 Summer Olympics in Helsinki.

References

Arthur Johnson's profile at Sports Reference.com

1921 births
2003 deaths
Canadian male canoeists
Canoeists at the 1952 Summer Olympics
Olympic canoeists of Canada